National Tertiary Route 913, or just Route 913 (or ) is a National Road Route of Costa Rica, located in the Guanacaste province.

Description
It is the main access to Santa Rosa National Park from Route 1.

In Guanacaste province the route covers Liberia canton (Nacascolo district), La Cruz canton (Santa Elena district).

Junction list
The route is completely within Santa Rosa National Park and within Liberia canton.

References

Highways in Costa Rica